Riccarton Park Racecourse is the main thoroughbred horse racecourse for the Christchurch city area in New Zealand.

History

The Canterbury Jockey Club was established in 1854 and held its first meeting at Hagley Park in Easter 1855. The Riccarton racecourse was reserved as a public recreation ground by the Canterbury Provincial Council in 1858 and leased to the Jockey Club.

Riccarton Racecourse became the home of the New Zealand Cup in 1867.

The Tea House and the Public Grandstand were designed by local architects, Alfred and Sidney Luttrell.

In October 2022 it was reported the Canterbury Jockey Club had been granted permission to demolish the 100-year old grandstand, despite opposition from heritage campaigners

Main races

On the Saturday prior to Canterbury Show and Cup week in November:
 The Group 1 New Zealand 2000 Guineas run over 1600m for 3yo horses, 
 The Listed Metropolitan Trophy Handicap, an Open handicap over 2500m.
 The Listed Pegasus Stakes, an Open handicap over 1000m.
 
On the Wednesday of the Canterbury Show and Cup week:
 The Group 3 Canterbury Breeders Stakes, a set weight plus penalties race for fillies and mares run over 1400m.
 The Group 3 Stewards Stakes Handicap, an Open Handicap raced over 1200m.
 The Group 2 Coupland Bakeries Mile (1600m), an Open Handicap.

On the Saturday of the Canterbury Show and Cup week in mid-November:
 The Group 3 New Zealand Cup run over 3200m (2 miles).
 The Group 1 New Zealand 1000 Guineas run over 1600m for 3yo fillies.
 The Listed Welcome Stakes, a 2-year old set weight race over 1000m.

In August:
 The Grand National Steeplechase, first run in 1875, which is 5600m.
 The Grand National Hurdles, run over 4200m.  
 The Group 3 Winter Cup, an Open Handicap over 1600m.
 
In September:
 The listed Canterbury Belle Stakes for 3-year-old fillies over 1200m.

Demographics
The Riccarton Racecourse statistical area includes a residential area between the racecourse and the commercial area of Hornby, New Zealand.

Riccarton Racecourse had a population of 1,206 at the 2018 New Zealand census, a decrease of 9 people (−0.7%) since the 2013 census, and an increase of 36 people (3.1%) since the 2006 census. There were 486 households. There were 618 males and 588 females, giving a sex ratio of 1.05 males per female. The median age was 38.5 years (compared with 37.4 years nationally), with 174 people (14.4%) aged under 15 years, 273 (22.6%) aged 15 to 29, 552 (45.8%) aged 30 to 64, and 207 (17.2%) aged 65 or older.

Ethnicities were 69.7% European/Pākehā, 8.7% Māori, 5.7% Pacific peoples, 21.1% Asian, and 3.5% other ethnicities (totals add to more than 100% since people could identify with multiple ethnicities).

The proportion of people born overseas was 28.6%, compared with 27.1% nationally.

Although some people objected to giving their religion, 45.5% had no religion, 40.5% were Christian, 2.5% were Hindu, 0.5% were Muslim, 1.5% were Buddhist and 3.0% had other religions.

Of those at least 15 years old, 198 (19.2%) people had a bachelor or higher degree, and 219 (21.2%) people had no formal qualifications. The median income was $34,800, compared with $31,800 nationally. The employment status of those at least 15 was that 573 (55.5%) people were employed full-time, 126 (12.2%) were part-time, and 39 (3.8%) were unemployed.

See also
 Thoroughbred racing in New Zealand
 Trentham Racecourse
 Ellerslie Racecourse
 Addington Raceway
 Glossary of Australian and New Zealand punting
 New Zealand Racing Hall of Fame

Reference list

External links
Official website

Horse racing venues in New Zealand
Sports venues in Christchurch